USS Hornet was the fifth United States Navy ship to bear the name Hornet. She was originally CSS Lady Stirling, a blockade runner built by James Ash at Cubitt Town, London in 1864 for the Confederate States Navy.   She was badly damaged and captured by the United States Navy on 28 October 1864 off Wilmington, North Carolina.

History
Following condemnation by a prize court, Lady Sterling was bought by the U.S. Navy, repaired, armed, and commissioned as USS Lady Sterling and later renamed USS Hornet on 25 April 1865. In navy service she mainly operated in the Chesapeake Bay squadron.  In October 1865, Hornet escorted the Confederate ironclad  from Cuba to the United States.

Hornet was decommissioned on 15 December 1865 and sold into private ownership in 1869.  After the war Hornet was involved in several filibustering expeditions to Cuba under the names Hornet and Cuba, including an unsuccessful mission in January 1871 to deliver weapons and ammunition to Cuban rebels during the Ten Years' War.

See also
 Blockade runners of the American Civil War
 Ships captured in the American Civil War

References

Bibliography
  Url
 
 

Lady Stirling
Ships of the Union Navy
Steamships of the United States Navy
Ships built in Cubitt Town
Ships captured by the United States Navy from the Confederate States Navy
1864 ships
Blockade runners of the American Civil War